George Webster (1797–1864) was an English architect who practised in Kendal, Westmorland. He worked mainly in domestic architecture, designing new houses, and remodelling older houses. His early designs were mainly in Neoclassical (Greek Revival) style. He later pioneered the use of the Tudor Revival style, and in some of his latest designs he incorporated Italianate features. He also designed some churches, all in Gothic Revival style, plus some public and commercial buildings.

Key

Buildings

References
Citations

Sources

Webster, George